Regulator of G protein signaling 9 binding protein is a protein that in humans is encoded by the RGS9BP gene.

Function

The protein encoded by this gene functions as a regulator of G protein-coupled receptor signaling in phototransduction. Studies in bovine and mouse show that this gene is expressed only in the retina, and is localized in the rod outer segment membranes. This protein is associated with a heterotetrameric complex, specifically interacting with the regulator of G-protein signaling 9, and appears to function as the membrane anchor for the other largely soluble interacting partners. Mutations in this gene are associated with prolonged electroretinal response suppression (PERRS), also known as bradyopsia.

References

Further reading